Jorge Huirse (August 30, 1920 – December 11, 1992) was a Peruvian composer and pianist.

Discography

References

1920 births
1992 deaths
Peruvian male composers
20th-century composers
20th-century male musicians